He Chong (born June 10, 1987 in Zhanjiang, Guangdong) is a Chinese diver. He is the 2008 Olympic Champion in the 3m springboard.

He split with partner Wang Feng after they won a gold medal in the 3m synchronised springboard event at the 2005 World Championships. The two staged a reunion and won gold at the same event in the 2006 Diving World Cup in Changshu, China.

At the 2008 Olympics He Chong defeated an elite field of divers including, the two time world champion Alexandre Despatie, the 2006 world cup champion Qin Kai, and eight time Olympic medalist Dmitri Sautin.

He lit the flame at the 2010 Asian Games opening ceremony.

He is often referred to as the greatest springboard diver in history due to having gone almost unbeaten from 2008 to 2016.   He is hoping to be the first diver to regain an individual diving Olympic title at the 2016 Rio Games, after a rare off day led to a loss of his title in 2012 where he won only bronze, his only loss in a Fina World Cup final, World Championships, or Olympics he competed in from 2008–2014.   He was left off the Chinese team for the 2016 Rio Games in favor of his own brother He Chao, the 2015 World 3 metre Champion.

Major performances
2005 World Championships – 1st 3m springboard synchro;
2005 National Games – 1st 1m springboard;
2006/2008 World Cup – 1st 1m/3m springboard
2008 Beijing Olympics 3m springboard Gold Medalist
2009 FINA World Championships 3m springboard Gold medallist
2012 London Olympics 3m springboard bronze

Olympic Games
3m Springboard 2008 Beijing, CHN 572.90

World Championships
3m Springboard 2013 Barcelona, SPA 544.95
3m Springboard 2011 Shanghai, CHN 554.30
3m Springboard 2009 Rome, ITA 505.20
Synchronised 3m Springboard 2005 Montreal, QC, CAN 384.42
1m Springboard 2007 Melbourne, VIC, AUS 469.85
3m Springboard 2005 Montreal, QC, CAN 730.77

Asian Games
3m Springboard 2010 Guangzhou, CHN 525.85

World Series
3m Springboard 2012 Moscow, RUS 497.65
3m Springboard 2012 Beijing, CHN 548.70
3m Springboard 2012 Dubai, UAE 522.25
3m Springboard 2011 Guanajuato, MEX 519.20
3m Springboard 2011 Sheffield, GBR 531.15
3m Springboard 2011 Beijing, CHN 536.25
3m Springboard 2011 Moscow, RUS 486.00

World Cup
3m Springboard 2012 London, GBR 535.35
3m Springboard 2010 Changzhou, CHN 546.55

Grand Prix
3m Springboard 2011 Fort Lauderdale, FL, USA 487.05

References

http://2008teamchina.olympic.cn/index.php/personview/personsen/749 
http://www.the-sports.org/diving-chong-he-results-identity-s10-c2-b4-o65-w16693.html

1987 births
Living people
Chinese male divers
Divers at the 2008 Summer Olympics
Divers at the 2012 Summer Olympics
Olympic divers of China
Olympic gold medalists for China
People from Zhanjiang
Olympic medalists in diving
Olympic bronze medalists for China
Sportspeople from Guangdong
Asian Games medalists in diving
Divers at the 2006 Asian Games
Divers at the 2010 Asian Games
Divers at the 2014 Asian Games
Medalists at the 2012 Summer Olympics
Medalists at the 2008 Summer Olympics
World Aquatics Championships medalists in diving
Asian Games gold medalists for China
Asian Games silver medalists for China
Medalists at the 2006 Asian Games
Medalists at the 2010 Asian Games
Medalists at the 2014 Asian Games
Universiade medalists in diving
Universiade gold medalists for China
Medalists at the 2011 Summer Universiade